is part of the Ishikari Mountains, Hokkaidō, Japan.

References
 Hokkaido, Seamless Digital Geographical Map of Japan, Geological Survey of Japan, AIST (ed.). 2007.

Otofuke